Meterana ochthistis is a species of moth in the family Noctuidae. It was described by Edward Meyrick in 1887 from specimens obtained in Christchurch. It is endemic to New Zealand.

References

Moths described in 1887
Moths of New Zealand
Hadeninae
Endemic fauna of New Zealand
Taxa named by Edward Meyrick
Endemic moths of New Zealand